Belford Hall is a Grade I listed building, an 18th-century mansion house situated at Belford, Northumberland.

The Manor of Belford was acquired by the Dixon family in 1726, and in 1752 Abraham Dixon built a mansion house in a Palladian style to a design by architect James Paine.

In 1770 heiress Margaret Dixon married William Brown. Their daughter later married Newcastle upon Tyne merchant, Lt. Col. William Clark, Deputy Lieutenant and High Sheriff of Northumberland
who, in 1818, remodelled the house and added two new wings, with the assistance of architect John Dobson.

An extensive  park, created in the mid 18th century, retains several original features and has been designated a conservation area. An 18th-century folly in the park is a Grade II listed building.

During World War II the Hall was requisitioned by the army and became neglected and dilapidated. In the 1980s it was acquired by the Northern Heritage Trust, renovated, restored, and converted to residential apartments. A golf course was created on a part of the park.

References
 

Country houses in Northumberland
Grade I listed buildings in Northumberland
Grade I listed houses
1752 establishments in Great Britain
Palladian architecture
Belford, Northumberland